The  is a branch of the Tokugawa clan based in Kii Province. The family was founded in 1619, when Tokugawa Yorinobu, 10th son of Tokugawa Ieyasu, was appointed to rule Kii Province.

History

Family Tree

References

Japanese clans